Mukesh Agnihotri (born 9 October 1962) is an Indian politician from Indian National Congress. Since 11 December 2022, he is the first Deputy Chief Minister of Himachal Pradesh. He is also a Member of Legislative Assembly in the Himachal Pradesh Legislative Assembly from the Haroli Constituency in the Una District of Himachal Pradesh. 

After winning the Haroli Constituency in Himachal Pradesh Assembly Elections in 2003, 2007, 2012 and 2017, he was inducted into the Cabinet as Industries Minister with additional charge of Labour & Employment, Parliamentary Affairs, Information & Public Relations from 2012 to 2017. He was the leader of the Congress Legislature Party in Himachal Pradesh from 2018 to 2022.

Political career

Elected to State Legislative Assembly in March, 2003 and got re-elected in 2007 from Santokhgarh Assembly Constituency. In 2012 he won from Haroli Assembly constituency. Before delimitation in 2007, Haroli Assembly segment was known as Santokhgarh. He got re-elected to the thirteenth Vidhan Sabha (4th term) from Haroli in 2017. He was elected as Congress Legislature Party Leader on 4th January, 2018. He won Haroli again in 2022 and currently is serving as the Deputy Chief Minister of Himachal Pradesh.

Personal life
Agnihotri was born in Sangrur, Punjab. He holds a Post Graduate Diploma in Public Relations & Advertisement and M.Sc. in Mathematics. He is married to Prof. Simmi Agnihotri and has one daughter.

See also
 Himachal Pradesh Legislative Assembly
 Government of Himachal Pradesh
 Tenth Legislative Assembly of Himachal Pradesh

References

Indian National Congress politicians from Himachal Pradesh
Himachal Pradesh MLAs 2007–2012
Himachal Pradesh MLAs 2012–2017
1962 births
Living people
Deputy Chief Ministers of Himachal Pradesh
Indian National Congress politicians